The Office of the chief of Air Defence is one of the major branches of Tatmadaw. It was established as the Air Defence Command in 1997, but was not fully operational until late 1999. It was renamed the Bureau of Air Defence in the early 2000s.In early 2000, Tatmadaw established the Myanmar Integrated Air Defence System (MIADS) with help from Russia, Ukraine and China. It is a tri-service bureau with units from all three branches of the armed forces. All air defence assets except anti-aircraft artillery are integrated into MIADS.

In 2010, Myanmar Air Defence Command completed installation of an optical fibre communication network throughout the country. The network is to be used for air defence operations between Central Command HQ from the capital (Nay Pyi Taw) and several air bases, early warning radar stations and mobile anti-aircraft missile and artillery units. After completion of the fibre optic project and radar stations, MIADS (Myanmar Integrated Air Defence System) is the most advance AD system in the region.

Organisational, command and control structure 
The Office of the chief of Air Defence is based in Nay Pyi Taw, and the position of the Chief of Air Defence is Lieutenant General. The position of Vice-Chief of Air Defence is held by a person with the rank of Major general. Three Brigadier generals from Myanmar Army, Myanmar Navy and Myanmar Air Force serve as Deputy-Chief of Air Defence. Under the Office of the chief of Air Defence, there are nine Air Defence Operation Commands and one Air Defence Training School. Each Air Defence Operation Command is also directed by a brigadier general. Under each Air Defence Operation Command, there is an Air Defence Early Warning Battalion, an Air Defence Signal Battalion, an Air Defence ECM Battalion, an Air Defence Mechanism Battalion, an Air Defence Workshop Battalion, and Air Defence Battalions() which are also known as La Ka Ta.

Each early warning battalion is equipped with a 3D air surveillance radar, such as JY-27A radar, YLC-2V radar, 80K6 radar and 1L-117 radar, or a 2D VHF radar, such as Vostok-E radar and P-18M radar. Each electronic countermeasure battalion is equipped with chinese and ukrainian mobile ECM and ELINT systems. Each air defence (mechanism) battalion is equipped with two batteries of medium-range air defence systems.
 
The air defence battalions (La Ka Ta) are divided into three; Anti-aircraft artillery battalions, short-range SAM battalions (for point defence role) and medium-range SAM battalions (for area defence role). Battalion numbers from 1,005 to 1019 are anti-aircraft artillery battalions and they are equipped with a large number of ground-based anti-aircraft guns. Battalion numbers from 2010 to 2032 are short-range SAM battalions and each battalion is equipped with a lot of MANPADs, 3-5 TH-5711 smart hunter radars or TWS-312 radars (licence built TH-5711 radar), 5 Tunguska-M1 self-propelled anti-aircraft systems or Tor-M1 and 10-15 Type-87 self-propelled anti-aircraft guns.

Battalion numbers from 3,009 to 3036 are medium-range SAM battalions and they are equipped with one battery of medium-range air defence systems or one battery of S-200 air defence system (only two battalions located at Nay Pyi Taw Region and Yangon Region) with additional target detection and tracking radars, height-finding radars, fire control radars, etc.

Chiefs

Lists of commands and battalions

Training school

Air Defence Operation Commands

Air defence battalions

Equipments 
The following is the list of equipments used by air defence battalions of Myanmar.

Anti-aircraft guns(AAA)

Man portable air defence systems(MANPADs)

Air defence systems(SAM)

Future equipments

 Pantsir S1 - On 22 January 2021 Senior General Min Aung Hlaing signed an agreement which included Pantsir S1 systems, Orlan-10E UAVs and radars during the Russian defence minister Sergey Shoygu visit to Naypyidaw.

Gallery

See also 

 Tatmadaw
 Myanmar Army
 Myanmar Navy
 Myanmar Air Force
 Military intelligence of Myanmar
 Myanmar Directorate of Defence Industries
 Directorate of Medical Services
 List of equipment of the Myanmar Army
 List of equipment in the Myanmar Navy

Reference 

Air defence forces
Military of Myanmar
Burmese military-related lists
Office of the Chief of Air Defence (Myanmar)